Robert Buderi is an American journalist, author, and editor. Buderi served as technology editor of BusinessWeek from 1990 to 1992 and editor-in-chief of MIT's Technology Review from 2002 to 2004. He was a research fellow at MIT's Center for International Studies from 2005 to 2007. In 2007, he founded Xconomy, a national business and technology news and media website based in Boston, for which he is CEO and editor-in-chief.

Buderi's first book, The Invention that Changed the World: How a Small Group of Radar Pioneers Won the Second World War and Launched a Technological Revolution was published in 1996 by Simon and Schuster. The book covers the development of radar technology in the United States during World War II and details how this technology determined the outcome of important battles. It argues that radar technology changed the course of the war and eventually led to Allied victory. It also covers how radar technology led to major innovations in the aftermath of World War II in fields such as electronics, space exploration, nuclear magnetic resonance, lasers, and computer networking.

History
Born in Berkeley, CA, Buderi attended the University of California, Berkeley and received his bachelor's degree from the University of California, Davis in 1977. In 1978, he earned a master's degree in journalism from the University of Arizona. In the 1986–87 academic year, he was a Knight Science Journalism Fellow at MIT (formerly known as a Vannevar Bush Fellow).

Bibliography
 The Invention that Changed the World: How a Small Group of Radar Pioneers Won the Second World War and Launched a Technological Revolution (Simon and Schuster, 1996)
 Engines of Tomorrow: How the World's Best Companies Are Using Their Research Labs to Win the Future (Simon and Schuster, 2000)
 Guanxi (The Art of Relationships): Microsoft, China, and the Plan to Win the Road Ahead (with Gregory T. Huang, Simon and Schuster, 2006)
 Naval Innovation for the 21st Century: The Office of Naval Research Since the End of the Cold War (Naval Institute Press, 2013)

References

Living people
Year of birth missing (living people)
Writers from Berkeley, California
University of California, Berkeley alumni
University of Arizona alumni
University of California, Davis alumni